The list of Italian Coast Guard vessels is a listing of all vessels to have been commissioned by the Corps of the Port Captaincies - Coast Guard during the history of that service.

Assets in service

Offshore vessels

Outer Patrol boats

Patrol boats

Motorboats

Survey vessels

Rigid-hulled inflatable boats

Training vessels

List of Italian Coast Guard retired vessels (since 1950)

Patrol boats

Rescue patrol boats

Motorboats

Coastal patrol boats

Fast patrol boats

Coastal boats

Anti pollution vessels

References

Corps of the Port Captaincies – Coast Guard